Petals for Armor I is the debut extended play (EP) by American singer-songwriter and Paramore frontwoman Hayley Williams. It was released on Atlantic Records on February 6, 2020, as the first in a planned series of releases in the Petals for Armor era. Williams explained the inspiration behind its title is due to her belief that "the best way for me to protect myself is to be vulnerable." The EP was produced by Williams' Paramore bandmate Taylor York and was written throughout 2019 during Paramore's hiatus after touring in support of their fifth studio album, After Laughter (2017).

The EP was supported by two singles; "Simmer" was released on January 22, 2020, and "Leave It Alone" on January 30. Each were accompanied with music videos which share a narrative.

Background
Following extensive touring in support of Paramore's fifth studio album After Laughter (2017), Hayley Williams expressed her feelings about the group's future moving forward explaining that they were not breaking up, however needed time away from writing and touring. In an interview with BBC Radio, in January 2020, Williams explained her process behind developing Petals for Armor.

In an Apple Music interview with Zane Lowe, Williams expressed that "Petals for Armor" was "a project", with Lowe confirming the first EP, which was released on February 6, 2020.

Singles
"Simmer" was released as the album's lead single on January 22, 2020, on Atlantic Records. The single's music video, directed by Warren Fu, premiered on the same day. "Simmer" had been continually teased on social media throughout January 2020, featuring visual and audio clips of the track and its video.

"Leave It Alone" was released as the album's second single, along with its music video, on January 30, 2020.

Track listing

Credits and personnel
Credits adapted from liner notes.

Musicians
 Hayley Williams – primary artist, lead vocals, keyboards, guitar
 Taylor York – production, additional instrumentation
 Joey Howard – bass guitar, keyboards, percussion
 Aaron Steele – drums, percussion, programming
 Benjamin Kaufman – violin, chin cello

Additional personnel
 Daniel James – string arrangements
 Carlos de la Garza – mixing engineer
 Dave Cooley – mastering engineer
 Kevin "K-Bo" Boettger – assistant engineer
 Michael Craver – assistant engineer, assistant mixing engineer
 David Fitzgibbons – assistant engineer, assistant mixing engineer
 Michelle Freetly – assistant engineer
 Jake Butler – assistant engineer

Charts

See also
List of 2020 albums

References

2020 debut EPs
Atlantic Records EPs
Hayley Williams albums
Albums produced by Taylor York